The 2022 WNBA season was be the 15th season for the Atlanta Dream of the Women's National Basketball Association. The team began the season on May 14, 2022, on the road against the Dallas Wings.

This was be the first season for new head coach Tanisha Wright. Wright was hired on October 12, 2021. Dan Padover was hired as the team's new General Manager, while Darius Taylor moved into the Assistant General Manager role - after serving as the team's interim head coach in the 2021 season.

The season stated well for Wright and the Dream, as they finished May 5–3.  However, a stronger schedule in June slowed down their momentum as they finished the month 4–8, including a four game and three game losing streak.  The Dream's struggles continued in July as they finished the month 3–7.  One bright spot in the month was a win over regular season champions Las Vegas, in Las Vegas.  The team lost their last four games of the season and finished 2–4 in August.  They finished in tenth place overall, missing the playoffs by one game.  Their fourteen wins were the most in a season since 2018 for the team.

Transactions

WNBA Draft

Trades and Roster Changes

Roster

Depth

Schedule

Preseason

|- style="background:#cfc;"
| 1
| April 24
| Washington
| W 88–69
| Kristy Wallace (17)
| Monique Billings (10)
| Aari McDonald (6)
| Gateway Center Arena854
| 1–0

|- style="background:#fcc;"
| 2
| May 1
| @ Connecticut
| L 78–94
| Aari McDonald (12)
| Billings/Hillmon (5)
| Caldwell/Howard/Parker (3)
| Mohegan Sun Arena3,244
| 1–1

Regular season

|- style="background:#cfc;"
| 1
| May 7
| @ Dallas
| W 66–59
| Rhyne Howard (16)
| Monique Billings (14)
| Rhyne Howard (4)
| College Park Center5,796
| 1–0
|- style="background:#cfc;"
| 2
| May 11
| Los Angeles
| W 77–75
| Rhyne Howard (21)
| BillingsCoffeyHoward (8)
| Erica Wheeler (5)
| Gateway Center Arena3,138
| 2–0
|- style="background:#fcc;"
| 3
| May 13
| Las Vegas
| L 73–96
| Aari McDonald (20)
| CoffeyWheeler (7)
| ParkerWallaceWheeler (3)
| Gateway Center Arena3,138
| 2–1
|- style="background:#cfc;"
| 4
| May 15
| @ Indiana
| W 85–79
| Rhyne Howard (33)
| CoffeyParker (6)
| Kristy Wallace (3)
| Gainbridge Fieldhouse1,745
| 3–1
|- style="background:#cfc;"
| 5
| May 17
| @ Indiana
| W 101–79
| Rhyne Howard (19)
| Aari McDonald (6)
| ParkerWheeler (6)
| Gainbridge Fieldhouse960
| 4–1
|- style="background:#fcc;"
| 6
| May 20
| Washington
| L 73–78
| Rhyne Howard (21)
| Nia Coffey (10)
| Kristy Wallace (5)
| Gateway Center ArenaN/A
| 4–2
|- style="background:#fcc;"
| 7
| May 24
| @ Washington
| L 50–70
| Aari McDonald (10)
| ParkerWallace (7)
| Erica Wheeler (4)
| Entertainment and Sports Arena2,867
| 4–3
|- style="background:#cfc;"
| 8
| May 29
| Phoenix
| W 81–54
| Kristy Wallace (17)
| Cheyenne Parker (10)
| Rhyne Howard (6)
| Gateway Center Arena3,138
| 5–3

|- style="background:#cfc;"
| 9
| June 1
| Minnesota
| W 84–76
| Rhyne Howard (22)
| Monique Billings (9)
| Erica Wheeler (9)
| Gateway Center Arena1,268
| 6–3
|- style="background:#fcc;"
| 10
| June 3
| Chicago
| L 65–73
| Cheyenne Parker (19)
| Cheyenne Parker (6)
| Erica Wheeler (5)
| Gateway Center Arena3,138
| 6–4
|- style="background:#cfc;"
| 11
| June 5
| Indiana
| W 75–66
| CoffeyHoward (16)
| Nia Coffey (10)
| Erica Wheeler (4)
| Gateway Center Arena3,000
| 7–4
|- style="background:#fcc;"
| 12
| June 7
| @ Seattle
| L 60–72
| Cheyenne Parker (13)
| Cheyenne Parker (10)
| Kristy Wallace (4)
| Climate Pledge Arena7,262
| 7–5
|- style="background:#fcc;"
| 13
| June 10
| @ Phoenix
| L 88–90
| Rhyne Howard (25)
| Cheyenne Parker (13)
| Rhyne Howard (5)
| Footprint Center7,650
| 7–6
|- style="background:#fcc;"
| 14
| June 15
| @ Connecticut
| L 92–105
| Asia Durr (21)
| Naz Hillmon (9)
| Aari McDonald (5)
| Mohegan Sun Arena4,014
| 7–7
|- style="background:#fcc;"
| 15
| June 17
| @ Chicago
| L 100–106 (OT)
| Asia Durr (21)
| HillmonParker (6)
| Rhyne Howard (7)
| Wintrust Arena7,435
| 7–8
|- style="background:#cfc;"
| 16
| June 21
| Dallas
| W 80–75
| Maya Caldwell (18)
| Rhyne Howard (8)
| Aari McDonald (5)
| Gateway Center ArenaN/A
| 8–8
|- style="background:#fcc;"
| 17
| June 24
| New York
| L 77–89
| Asia Durr (23)
| Rhyne Howard (8)
| Aari McDonald (4)
| Gateway Center Arena2,697
| 8–9
|- style="background:#fcc;"
| 18
| June 26
| Connecticut
| L 61–72
| Aari McDonald (17)
| Rhyne Howard (7)
| HowardMcDonald (4)
| Gateway Center Arena2,722
| 8–10
|- style="background:#fcc;"
| 19
| June 28
| @ Washington
| L 74–92
| Asia Durr (13)
| MompremierParker (5)
| Asia Durr (4)
| Entertainment and Sports Arena3,517
| 8–11
|- style="background:#cfc;"
| 20
| June 30
| @ New York
| W 92–81 (OT)
| Tiffany Hayes (21)
| HillmonParker (7)
| Erica Wheeler (8)
| Barclays Center6,161
| 9–11

|- style="background:#cfc;"
| 21
| July 3
| Seattle
| W 90–76
| Cheyenne Parker (21)
| Monique Billings (10)
| Kristy Wallace (6)
| Gateway Center Arena3,138
| 10–11
|- style="background:#fcc;"
| 22
| July 6
| Washington
| L 66–85
| BillingsHayesR. HowardCh. Parker (10)
| Monique Billings (9)
| Monique Billings (4)
| Gateway Center Arena1,810
| 10–12
|- style="background:#fcc;"
| 23
| July 12
| @ Chicago
| L 75–90
| Cheyenne Parker (14)
| Tiffany Hayes (8)
| R. HowardMcDonald (3)
| Wintrust Arena7,074
| 10–13
|- style="background:#fcc;"
| 24
| July 15
| Connecticut
| L 68–93
| Tiffany Hayes (18)
| Naz Hillmon (11)
| Erica Wheeler (6)
| Gateway Center Arena2,962
| 10–14
|- style="background:#cfc;"
| 25
| July 17
| @ Phoenix
| W 85–75
| Cheyenne Parker (21)
| Cheyenne Parker (12)
| Erica Wheeler (7)
| Footprint Center7,963
| 11–14
|- style="background:#cfc;"
| 26
| July 19
| @ Las Vegas
| W 92–76
| Tiffany Hayes (31)
| Naz Hillmon (10)
| Cheyenne Parker (5)
| Michelob Ultra Arena5,952
| 12–14
|- style="background:#fcc;"
| 27
| July 21
| @ Los Angeles
| L 78–85
| HayesMcDonald (18)
| Rhyne Howard (9)
| Ch. ParkerWheeler (4)
| Crypto.com Arena10,021
| 12–15
|- style="background:#fcc;"
| 28
| July 24
| @ Seattle
| L 72–82
| Rhyne Howard (23)
| Naz Hillmon (14)
| HillmonWheeler (4)
| Climate Pledge Arena12,654
| 12–16
|- style="background:#fcc;"
| 29
| July 28
| Minnesota
| L 85–92
| Tiffany Hayes (24)
| HillmonCh. Parker (6)
| Aari McDonald (3)
| Gateway Center Arena2,396
| 12–17
|- style="background:#fcc;"
| 30
| July 30
| Dallas
| L 68–81
| Rhyne Howard (22)
| HillmonR. HowardCh. Parker (6)
| Erica Wheeler (6)
| Gateway Center Arena3,138
| 12–18

|- style="background:#cfc;"
| 31
| August 3
| Indiana
| W 91–81
| Rhyne Howard (20)
| Maya Caldwell (7)
| CaldwellMcDonald (6)
| Gateway Center Arena2,071
| 13–18
|- style="background:#cfc;"
| 32
| August 5
| Los Angeles
| W 88–86
| Rhyne Howard (28)
| Naz Hillmon (9)
| Erica Wheeler (4)
| Gateway Center Arena3,138
| 14–18
|- style="background:#fcc;"
| 33
| August 7
| @ Minnesota
| L 71–81
| R. HowardMcDonald (16)
| Naz Hillmon (7)
| Cheyenne Parker (5)
| Target Center9,421
| 14–19
|- style="background:#fcc;"
| 34
| August 9
| @ Las Vegas
| L 90–97
| CaldwellWheeler (17)
| Naz Hillmon (8)
| McDonaldCh. Parker (5)
| Michelob Ultra Arena5,151
| 14–20
|- style="background:#fcc;"
| 35
| August 12
| New York
| L 70–80
| Erica Wheeler (16)
| Monique Billings (9)
| Erica Wheeler (3)
| Gateway Center Arena3,138
| 14–21
|- style="background:#fcc;"
| 36
| August 14
| @ New York
| L 83–87
| Rhyne Howard (24)
| Naz Hillmon (7)
| Rhyne Howard (7)
| Barclays Center7,489
| 14–22
|-

Standings

Statistics

Regular Season

‡Waived/Released during the season
†Traded during the season
≠Acquired during the season

Awards and Honors

References

External links
The Official Site of the Atlanta Dream

Atlanta Dream seasons
Atlanta
Atlanta Dream